Wellstedia is a genus of flowering plants traditionally included in the family Boraginaceae s.l., but placed in its own family, Wellstediaceae within the Boraginales order, by the Boraginales Working Group.

Species include:
 Wellstedia dinteri Pilg.
 Wellstedia filtuensis D.R.Hunt & Lebrun
 Wellstedia laciniata Thulin & A.Johanss.
 Wellstedia robusta Thulin
 Wellstedia socotrana Balf.f.
 Wellstedia somalensis Thulin & A.Johanss.

References

Bibliography 

 

 
Taxonomy articles created by Polbot
Boraginaceae genera
Taxa named by Isaac Bayley Balfour